Tobe Watson (born 3 December 1997) is a former Australian rules football player who played for Fremantle in the Australian Football League (AFL).

Originally from Donnybrook in the South West region of Western Australia, Watson attended Guildford Grammar School. He then played for Swan Districts in the West Australian Football League (WAFL).

Drafted with the 22nd selection in the 2019 rookie draft, Watson played the entire 2019 season for Peel Thunder before making his AFL debut for Fremantle in round 8 of the 2020 AFL season as a late replacement for Brennan Cox.

In August 2021 Watson was informed that he would not be offered a contract extension for 2022.

References

External links

 

1997 births
Living people
Fremantle Football Club players
Swan Districts Football Club players
Peel Thunder Football Club players
Australian rules footballers from Western Australia
People from Donnybrook, Western Australia